Temnolopha mosaica is a moth of the family Tortricidae first described by Oswald Bertram Lower in 1901. It is found in Sri Lanka, Thailand, Cambodia, Java, Sulawesi, the Moluccan Islands, the Philippines and the Australian state of Queensland.

Description
The wingspan of the adult is 2 cm. Forewings brownish with dark swirly markings. Its larval host plant is Alpinia galanga.

References

Moths of Asia
Moths described in 1901